The MEKO family of warships was developed by the German company Blohm+Voss. MEKO is a registered trademark. The portmanteau stands for "Mehrzweck-Kombination" (English: multi-purpose-combination). It is a concept in modern naval shipbuilding based on modularity of armament, electronics and other equipment, aiming at ease of maintenance and cost reduction.

MEKO ships include families of frigates, corvettes and ocean-going patrol boats. Construction of MEKO ships began in the late 1970s with the design and later building of Nigeria's MEKO 360 H1. Vessels of similar classes use different weapons systems. For example, for the main gun, some MEKO 200s use the Mk 45 Mod 2 gun, others use the French 100 mm naval gun or Otobreda 76 mm gun.

The latest variant is the "Combat Ship for the Littorals" or MEKO CSL. It has also been called a "Littoral Combatant Ship", but it is much smaller than the American Littoral Combat Ship (LCS). There was speculation that this design would be of interest to Israel,  but it was not. Ultimately however, Israel opted for four modified K130 Braunschweig-class corvettes, the first of which is expected to enter service in 2019. Four extended versions of MEKO A-100 light frigate vessels are planned to be supplied for the Brazilian Navy between 2025 and 2028. The consortium is formed by Germany's Thyssenkrupp Marine Systems, Embraer Defense & Security and Atech, a subsidiary of the Embraer Group. The construction of the vessels, which are more than 100 meters long, are planned for the Oceana shipyard in Itajaí.

Models 
The following MEKO models are known to have been built, organized by lineage and delivery dates:
 MEKO 360 (1981) is the earliest MEKO ship.
 MEKO 140 (1985) is designed as a companion ship of MEKO 360, developed from the João Coutinho.
 MEKO 200 (1987) is a frigate design. It evolved into the MEKO A-200 (2001) and the larger MEKO A-300 (planned for Greece and Poland).
 F123 (1994), F124 (2002), and F125 (2016) are a line of MEKO frigates developed for the German Navy.
 K130 (2008) is a corvette designed for the German Navy using some F124 technology.
 Isreli Sa'ar 6 (2021) is a heavily modified descendant.
 MEKO A-100 (2019) is a current design.
 The 2012 A-100 is a single corvette developed from the A-200. It is occasionally quoted as the same as the MEKO 100 RMN (2004).
 The current design is a family of three sizes (all heavier and longer than the 2012 A-100): corvette, light frigate, patrol corvette.

, the MEKO website showcases A-200, F125, and A-100 models. The following models are once mentioned on the website, but no examples are known to have been built:

 MEKO CSL (2012 website).
 MEKO D Corvette (2012 website).
 MEKO 100 patrol corvette (2012 website). Based on both K130 and MEKO 100 patrol vessel.
 MEKO A-300 frigate based on A-200 and F-125 offered Greece and Poland

Vessels

References

External links

 Brandenburg-class @ Naval-Technology
 Hydra-class @ Naval-Technology
 MEKO A-class @ Naval-Technology
 Sachsen-class @ Naval-Technology
 https://web.archive.org/web/20070927012203/http://www.hansa-online.de/print.asp?artikelID=274 (German)
 Blohm+Voss Class MEKO® A100 Corvette
 At IndoDefence 2012, German shipyard TKMS presented its latest range of Corvettes and OPV

Shipbuilding
Ship types